Irada may refer to:

People
Azerbaijani girl's name (İradə) :
Irada Aliyeva (1991), Azerbaijani paralympic athlete
Irada Ashumova (1958), female Azerbaijani sport shooter
Irada Rovshan (1968), Azerbaijani scientist

Film
Irada (1944 film), Indrapuri Studio, with songs by Hemanta Mukherjee featuring Patience Cooper
Irada (1991 film) (Hindi: इरादा "intention")
Irada (2017 film) (Hindi: इरादा "intention") upcoming Indian film directed by Aparnaa Singh
Irada Pakka, Marathi film  2010

Politics
Al-Irada (Arabic: الإرادة "The Will") Tunisian political party  founded  2015
People's Will Party (Arabic: حزب الإرادة الشعبية Hizb Al Irada Al-Sha'abia)  political party in Syria 2000